Chung King-fai, SBS, is a Hong Kong actor and pioneer of contemporary performing art. He is also a director, TV producer, programme host and performing arts educator. He is the founder and president of the Hong Kong Federation of Drama Societies, Art Form Panels of the Hong Kong Leisure and Cultural Services Department, Chairman of Exploration Theatre, and Art Director of Hong Kong Arts Development Council.

Education and career
Chung finished his secondary education in Pui Ching Middle School before studying at Chung Chi College, at the Chinese University of Hong Kong, majoring in English. He received a BA degree in Speech and Drama from Oklahoma Baptist University and his master's degree in Fine Arts from Yale School of Drama (1962). Back in Hong Kong, he was an actor and executive producer with the two major television broadcasters, and lecturer at Hong Kong Baptist University. He has also been an advisor to Hong Kong Repertory Theatre. In 1983, Chung was appointed the founding Dean of the School of Drama at the Hong Kong Academy for the Performing Arts.

Chung introduced Theatre of the Absurd and Broadway musicals to Hong Kong audiences in Cantonese (mother tongue of the major population), with numerous stage performances. He has directed over 80 productions, including Equus, West Side Story, Rashomon, Teahouse, Xiaojing Hutong, Grease, M Butterfly, A Sentimental Journey and Noises off.

Chung also holds an honorary fellowship at the Hong Kong Academy for Performing Arts 
and an honorary doctorate from Armstrong University of California.

Film(s)

Television series

Awards and achievements
 1992, 1993, 1996, 1997  Best Director, Hong Kong Drama Awards
 1994, 1995, 1996 and 1999 Best Actor, Hong Kong Drama Awards
 1994	Ten Years Outstanding Achievement Award, Hong Kong Drama Awards
 1999	Artist of the Year (Stage Director), Hong Kong Artists’ Guild
 2000	Drama Achievement Award, Hong Kong Arts Development Council
 2001	Fellowship from Hong Kong Academy for the Performing Arts
 2002	Silver Bauhinia Star
 2005	Most Outstanding TV Actor, Ming Pao Weekly
 2006	Hong Kong Television Broadcasts Limited
 2007	World Outstanding Chinese Award

References

|-

|-
!colspan="3" style="background: #DAA520;" | Ming Pao Weekly Magazine Awards

1937 births
Living people
Alumni of the Chinese University of Hong Kong
Oklahoma Baptist University alumni
Yale School of Drama alumni
TVB veteran actors
Chung King-fai
Chung King-fai
Thai emigrants to Hong Kong
Members of the National Committee of the Chinese People's Political Consultative Conference
People from Taishan, Guangdong
Hong Kong Basic Law Consultative Committee members
Hong Kong male television actors
Hong Kong male film actors
20th-century Hong Kong male actors
21st-century Hong Kong male actors
Hong Kong Drama Awards winners